Artemision may refer to:

 Temple of Artemis in Ephesus, one of the Seven Wonders of the Ancient World
 Artemisium, another name of the ancient city of Hēmeroskopeion
 Artemisium, a cape in northern Euboea, Greece
 Artemision Bronze
 Battle of Artemisium